Tajabad (also Romanized as Tājābād) is a village in Mohammadabad Rural District, in the Central District of Marvdasht County, Fars Province, Iran. At the 2006 census, its population was 402, in 103 families.

References 

Populated places in Marvdasht County